The Fire Station No. 4 is a historic fire station in Miami, Florida. It is located at 1000 South Miami Avenue. On March 8, 1984, it was added to the U.S. National Register of Historic Places.

In October 2007, it became the home of the restaurant "Dolores but you can call me Lolita".

References

External links

 Dade County listings at National Register of Historic Places
 Florida's Office of Cultural and Historical Programs
 Dade County listings
 Fire Station No. 4 Building

Fire stations completed in 1900
Defunct fire stations in Florida
Buildings and structures in Miami
National Register of Historic Places in Miami
Fire stations on the National Register of Historic Places in Florida